Robert Swift (born 1985) is an American basketball player.

Robert Swift may also refer to:

 Bob Swift (Robert Virgil Swift, 1915–1966), American baseball catcher, coach, manager and scout
 Bob Swift (Canadian football) (born 1943), American offensive lineman in the Canadian Football League
 Rob Swift (born 1972), American hip-hop DJ and turntablist

See also
 Swift (disambiguation)